Laurentius Blumentrost (8 November 1692 – 14 June 1755) was a Russian Imperial state figure, the personal physician to the Tsar Peter the Great, founder and first president of the St. Petersburg Academy of Sciences, from December 7, 1725, to June 6, 1733.

Biography

Blumentrost was born in Moscow on October 29 (Julian calendar) or November 8, 1692 (Gregorian calendar). His father, Laurentius Blumentrost the Elder, a man of German origins, was personal physician to Tsar Alexis. Laurentius taught his son Latin and Greek, He later studied under Justus Samuel Scharschmidt and at Pastor Glück's Lutheran school in the German settlement in Moscow. In 1706, he began to attend university at Halle, then Oxford and finally Leiden, where he studied under Herman Boerhaave, defended his thesis, De secretione animali, in 1713 and received a medical degree in 1714.

Court physician
On his return to Russia, Blumentrost was appointed personal physician to Princess Natalia, Tsar Alexis's daughter and Tsar Peter the Great's sister. He continued his studies in Paris and Amsterdam (with Frederik Ruysch, from whom he bought anatomical specimens on behalf of the Russian government for the Kunstkamera). After his return to St. Petersburg, Peter the Great sent him to the Olonets Governorate to study the Marcial mineral springs in Kondopozhsky District.

When Robert Erskine, the Tsar's Scottish-born personal physician, died in 1718, Blumentrost was appointed to the position. He kept Johann Daniel Schumacher, Erskine's assistant who had studied at the University of Strasbourg and had been in charge of the Imperial Library and the Kunstkamera under Erskine, on as his secretary.

Academy of Sciences
In 1724, on the Tsar's orders, he founded the Saint Petersburg Academy of Sciences. The first session was held after Peter's death, on November 12, 1725, and it opened officially in December with Blumentrost as its first president. Most of the members were recruited abroad; with the assistance of the philosopher Christian Wolff, he successfully invited the Bernoulli brothers Nicholas and Daniel, Christian Goldbach, physician Georg Bilfinger, astronomer and geographer Joseph De L’Isle and historian Gerhard Müller, among others. In 1727 Leonhard Euler joined the academy at Blumentrost's invitation in a letter sent via Daniel Bernoulli.

He remained president of the academy under Empress Catherine I; when she was succeeded by Peter II, he followed the court to Moscow in 1728, after signing an order under which Schumacher was left in charge of the academy, with three academicians appointed to 4-month terms as his deputies. This led to discord among the members.  After the Tsar's death, Blumentrost lost his influence. Nicolaas Bidloo did not approve of his treatment methods and he did not dare appear before the new Empress, Anna. He remained president of the academy until 1733 and returned to St. Petersburg, where he lived in the palace of the Empress' sister, Catherine Ivanovna, Duchess of Mecklenburg.

Retirement and death

The Duchess of Mecklenburg died on June 14, 1733. The Empress ordered an investigation of Blumentrost; no fault was found on his part, but by 19 June he had been stripped of his positions and income and expelled from St. Petersburg. For a few years he lived in Moscow and had a private medical practice. In 1738, under the patronage of archiater Johann Bernhard Fischer, he became head physician at the Moscow military hospital and director of the hospital school. Empress Anna did not trust Blumentrost, mainly because of his devotion to the two daughters of Peter the Great and Catherine, Anna and Elizabeth. When Elizabeth became Empress, he came back into royal favour. She reinstated his rank of State Councillor and raised his salary. In 1754 he was appointed curator of the newly opened University of Moscow.

Blumentrost died in St. Petersburg on 27 March 1755 of hydrothorax. He is buried at the church of St. Sampson the Hospitable, now Saint Sampson's Cathedral.

Blumentrost's brothers Ivan (Johannes Deodatus or Johann Deodat; 1676–1756) and Christian were also court physicians. Ivan was also personal physician to Peter I (and his field physician and archiater) and had also studied in Halle and Leiden. He fell out of favour under Empress Anna and died in poverty in 1756; he is buried in the same grave with Laurentius.

References

Full Members of the Russian Academy of Sciences
1692 births
1755 deaths
Physicians from Moscow
18th-century physicians from the Russian Empire